Transvection may refer to:

Transvection (flying)
Transvection (genetics)

Mathematics 
The creation of transvectants in invariant theory
A shear mapping in linear algebra
Raising and lowering indices